The Afrikaner, also known as the Africander, is a breed of taurine-indicine ("Sanga") cattle indigenous to South Africa.

Huge herds of Sanga type cattle were herded by the Khoikhoi (Hottentots) when the Dutch established the Cape Colony in 1652.

History 
Afrikaners share coancestry with the Nguni and Drakensberger breeds. They most likely diverged 655–960 years ago. Anecdotal evidence from Portuguese sailors suggest that herds of Afrikaner-like cattle had been kept by the Khoikhoi since at least the 15th Century.

The breed almost became extinct in the early 20th century during the Second Boer War, their numbers depleted through destruction and due to an outbreak of Rinderpest that halved the country's total cattle population. After the war, programs were put in place to improve the breed.

In 1912, the first Afrikaner studbook was formed in South Africa in order to control the breed's development. However, due to the recently depleted numbers of Afrikaner cattle, a high degree of inbreeding occurred at this time.

In 1923, it was proposed that Afrikaners be sent to the United States, and in 1932 the US government imported a herd to introduce new blood to the Gulf Coast. In 1929, a bull and two cows (one a calf) were gifted to the King George V by the Africander Cattle Breeders' Society of South Africa. The first five Afrikaners arrived in Australia in 1953 and were taken to the CSIRO's Belmont station for research into their adaptability to the Australian climate. They were imported from Texas and Florida.

During the first half of the 20th century, Afrikaners were being bred to reduce the size of their hump, as this was unsightly to farmers used to the taurine cattle shape.

The Afrikaner was the most abundant cattle breed in South Africa until the 1970s, however, problems associated with inbreeding, lowered fertility and decreased reproductive period in cows decreased their popularity among local farmers. Crossbreeding with exotic cattle breeds may have also contributed to the decline in population numbers, as well as the introduction of the Brahman to southern Africa.

Breed characteristics

Afrikaners are usually deep red. They have the small cervical-thoracic hump typical of Sanga cattle.

The Afrikaner is a well-muscled breed, with long legs and a shallow body. They have long, lateral horns that turn upwards, although these are often polled in commercial operations. Bulls weigh 820–1,090 kg, and cows weigh 450–600 kg. The legs are slightly sickle shaped. They have good resistance to tick-borne diseases. They are well adapted to the local hot, arid conditions, as the sweat glands in their skin are more active than those of taurine cattle. This makes them more tolerant of heat than European breeds. They are more economical to keep, and a greater number of Afrikaners can be kept on the same plot of land as European cattle. They have a good temperament and are easy to handle.

Afrikaners have good fertility, and can continue to calve over the age of 16 years, with records showing cows calving at 21. The cows are very maternal, and one female will often care for a number of calves while their mothers graze elsewhere. They have few calving problems, due to the structure of their hindquarters and small calf sizes (30–35 kg). They have a low calf mortality rate.

There is a medium to high degree of genetic variation within this breed with a low inbreeding coefficient, despite the historic decline in numbers.

Uses
The Khoikhoi used the Afrikaners for meat and milk. Afrikaners were used primarily as draught animals after European settlement, often driven in large teams with as many as 14 animals. They were bred and developed to better suit this purpose, and were prized by the voortrekkers. They were also used as dairy cows, though less commonly, producing higher butterfat contents than other cattle breeds, without the need for supplementary feed. It was Afrikaner oxen which drew the wagons that carried the Voortrekkers on the Great Trek.

Commercial 
Afrikaners are used commercially to produce beef, and are often crossbred with other breeds in order to improve meat quality, particularly in regards to tenderness, as well as their greater ability to add weight on poor quality forage. The South African breed society promotes the use of Afrikaners as a dam line for crossbreeding.

Crossbreeding 
Crossbreeding with Afrikaners increases the heat tolerance of taurine breeds.

Bonsmara cattle are the result of crossing Afrikaners with Herefords and Shorthorns. They were developed during the 1960s.

Belmont Red cattle are the result of crossing Afrikaners with Herefords and Shorthorns by the CSIRO in Rockhampton, Queensland. They were bred in an effort to produce a breed that was better suited to beef production in hot, dry areas.

The Afrigus is a modern 50–50 hybrid of Afrikaner and Aberdeen Angus, with some influence of Bonsmara, Drakensberger and Tuli. An Afrikaner–Angus cross developed in the 1930s in Louisiana – sometimes called Africangus – was unsuccessful.

References

 Felius, Marleen (1985) Genus Bos: Cattle Breeds of the World MSO-AGVET (Merck & Co., Inc.), Rahway, N.J., OCLC 13726656
 Mason, I.L. (1996) A World Dictionary of Livestock Breeds, Types and Varieties (4th ed.) C.A.B International, Wallingford, Oxofordshire, UK, 
 Timmins, Lisa (ed.) (1989) Handbook of Australian Livestock (3rd ed.) Australian Meat & Livestock Corporation, Sydney,

External links
 "The modern Afrikaner" The South African Stud Book and Livestock Improvement Association

Cattle breeds
Cattle breeds originating in South Africa
Red cattle